The Ladd-Gilman House, also known as Cincinnati Memorial Hall, is a historic house at 1 Governors Lane in Exeter, New Hampshire, United States. The home was built about 1721 by Nathaniel Ladd as one of the state's first brick houses, and was subsequently clapboarded three decades later. The home was purchased in 1747 by Daniel Gilman, a prominent Exeter merchant. It served as the state treasury during the American Revolutionary War when two members of the Gilman family, Col. Nicholas Gilman and his son John Taylor Gilman, later the state's governor, served as treasurers of the state. Also born in the house was Founding Father Nicholas Gilman, Jr., a signer of the United States Constitution and U.S. senator from New Hampshire.

The Ladd-Gilman House was declared a National Historic Landmark in 1973, principally for its association with Nicholas Gilman, Jr. It has been maintained since 1902 by the Society of the Cincinnati, in which organization the Gilman family took a prominent role. The Ladd-Gilman House and its grounds are part of the campus of Exeter's American Independence Museum.

Description and construction history
The house is a rambling frame structure, consisting of a main block and a series of additions. The main block was originally built as a two-story brick structure. After Daniel Gilman purchased the house in 1747, it was extensively altered by Col. Nathaniel Gilman, his son. He removed the wall separating the two rooms on the right side, and built the two-bay addition beside it, knocking down the original house wall on that side, and then clapboarding the rest of the house to match the new work. A further addition, originally designed as a caretaker's residence, was added after the Society of the Cincinnati acquired the house in 1902. The interior portions of the main house feature original woodwork, including paneling, deep window seats, and fluted pilasters.

See also

Gilman Garrison House
List of National Historic Landmarks in New Hampshire
National Register of Historic Places listings in Rockingham County, New Hampshire
New Hampshire Historical Marker No. 161: Ladd-Gilman House

References

External links
 The Ladd-Gilman House, American Independence Museum, Exeter
 The Gilman Family, Framers of Freedom, SeaCoastNH.com

Exeter, New Hampshire
National Historic Landmarks in New Hampshire
Houses on the National Register of Historic Places in New Hampshire
Houses completed in 1755
Gilman family of New Hampshire
Historic house museums in New Hampshire
Biographical museums in New Hampshire
Museums in Exeter, New Hampshire
Houses in Rockingham County, New Hampshire
Historic district contributing properties in New Hampshire
National Register of Historic Places in Rockingham County, New Hampshire
Homes of United States Founding Fathers